Gabriela Kubová (born 9 May 1993) is a Czech ice dancer who competes with Matěj Novák. With former partner Dmitri Kiselev, she is the 2012 Czech national champion.

Career 
Early in her career, Kubová skated with Petr Seknička. They competed on the ISU Junior Grand Prix series for two seasons.

In 2009, Kubová teamed up with Russian ice dancer Dmitri Kiselev to compete for the Czech Republic. In their first two seasons together, they competed on the junior level and placed 14th at the 2010 World Junior Championships. Moving up to the senior level in the 2011–12 season, Kubová/Kiselev won the silver medal at the Pavel Roman Memorial and gold at the Czech national championships. They were assigned to the 2012 European Championships, placing 18th, and to the 2012 World Championships, placing 26th. Kiselev retired from competition in autumn 2012.

In 2012, Kubová teamed up with Matěj Novák.

Programs

With Novák

With Kiselev

Competitive highlights

With Novák

With Kiselev

With Seknička

References

External links 

 
 
 

Czech female ice dancers
1993 births
Living people
Figure skaters from Brno